KZBG (97.7 FM) is a radio station broadcasting a country music format. Licensed to Lapwai, Idaho, United States, the station serves the Lewiston area. The station is currently owned by James and Darcy Nelly, through licensee Nelly Broadcasting, LLC.

History
The station was assigned the calls KFFR on 1996-09-12. On 2007-08-06, the station changed to the current KZBG.

HD Radio
KZBG broadcasts on three additional subchannels:
 On HD2, it broadcasts a top 40 format, branded as "B97.3".
 On HD3, it broadcasts a classic country format. In January 2018, it rebranded from "Big Country Classics" to "92.1 Hank FM".
 On HD4, it broadcasts a classic rock format, branded as "Big Rock 99.1". On October 21, 2019, it changed their format from sports to classic rock, branded as "Big Rock 99.1".

References

External links

ZBG
Country radio stations in the United States
Radio stations established in 2005
2005 establishments in Idaho